Kentucky Route 709 (KY 709) is a  state highway in northern Alexandria, Kentucky, that connects U.S. Route 27 (US 27) to KY 9 (AA Highway) and Thelma Lee Drive adjacent to the Village Green Shopping Center.

History
Prior to the addition of the state designation in 1999, the route of KY 709 was originally known as the East Alexandria Connector.

Major intersections

References

0709
0709